NVV may refer to

 Nederlands Verbond van Vakverenigingen - a Dutch labour union;
 Nordhessischer Verkehrsverbund - a transport association in northern Hesse, Germany;
 Nederlandse Vereniging voor Veganisme - a Dutch organisation in support of veganism.